Acompsia delmastroella  is a moth of the family Gelechiidae. It is found in the south-western Alps (Alpi Cozie, Alpes Maritimes, Alpes-de-Haute-Provence). The habitat consists of alpine meadows.

The wingspan is 15–16 mm for males and 13–14 mm for females. The forewings are olive-brown, slightly shining and mottled with lighter scales. The hindwings are dark grey. Adults are on wing from July to mid-August. Adults have been observed in the flowers of Helianthemum nummularium.

References

Moths described in 1998
Acompsia
Moths of Europe